Typographica was the name of a journal of typography and visual arts founded and edited by Herbert Spencer from 1949 to 1967. Spencer was just 25 years old when the first Typographica was issued. He also served as the editor of the journal.

Typographica was produced in two series: the "Old Series" and the "New Series". Each series was published in sixteen issues.

See also
 Watching Words Move, by Ivan Chermayeff and Tom Geismar, Chronicle Books, 2006. – This book was developed from the insert in Typographica 6 (New Series).

References

 Typographica, by Rick Poynor, Princeton Architectural Press, New York, 2002.
 The Liberated Page: An Anthology of Major Typographic Experiments of This Century as Recorded in Typographica Magazine, by Herbert Spencer, Lund Humphries.
 Eye, No. 31, Vol. 8, edited by Max Bruinsma, Quantum Publishing, London, Spring 1999.
 Typographica, Rick Poynor, Baseline 35, edited by Mike Daines & Hans Dieter Reichert, Bradbourne Publishing, 2001.

External links
 WorldCat record

Defunct magazines published in the United Kingdom
Design magazines
Magazines established in 1949
Magazines disestablished in 1967
Typography
Visual arts magazines published in the United Kingdom
Magazines published in London